John Barber (born June 27, 1927) is a retired American professional basketball player. He played collegiately for California State University, Los Angeles and was selected by the Minneapolis Lakers in the 1956 NBA draft. Barber played for the St. Louis Hawks in the NBA for 5 games during the 1956–57 season. He is the grandfather of Jason and Jeryl Sasser, who also played in the NBA.

Barber is also one of 36 American basketball players to ever score 100 or more points in a basketball game, and he is the only one to do it three times.  Barber scored a career high and NCAA record 188 points vs. Chapman College in 1953.  He also scored 150 points in an exhibition game vs LA Scribes magazine team, and 103 vs Los Angeles Community College.

References

External links
 

1927 births
Living people
Basketball players from Georgia (U.S. state)
Cal State Los Angeles Golden Eagles men's basketball players
Minneapolis Lakers draft picks
People from Atlanta, Texas
St. Louis Hawks players
Small forwards
American men's basketball players